Miss Nicaragua 2021  was held on August 14, 2021 at the Holiday Inn Managua - Convention Center in Managua. Ana Marcelo of Estelí crowned her successor Allison Wassmer of Managua at the end of the event.

Wassmer represented Nicaragua at the Miss Universe 2021 pageant in Israel. But she can't qualify in the top 16.

Results

Placements

Official Contestants
6 contestants competed for the title of Miss Nicaragua 2021.

Crossovers Notes
Glennys Medina participated in Miss Costa Rica 2020 where she did not qualify and in Miss World Nicaragua 2016.

Withdraws
 Santo Tomás - Geyssell García
 Chinandega - Katty Davis

Notes

References

Miss Nicaragua
2021 in Nicaragua
2021 beauty pageants